Callum James McNaughton born (25 October 1991) is a retired English footballer who is currently a coach at Juventus Academy Boston.

Club career

West Ham United
Starting as a youth team player with West Ham aged 14, McNaughton signed professionally in 2010. After a loan period with Bishop's Stortford in 2011 he made his debut and was sent-off in West Ham's 2–1 home defeat to Aldershot Town in the League Cup on 24 August 2011.

AFC Wimbledon
On 9 September 2011, McNaughton joined League Two club AFC Wimbledon on a month-long loan. He made his debut on 10 September against Aldershot Town in a 1–1 away draw. He was praised by AFC Wimbledon manager Terry Brown for his commanding performance at the back. In January 2012 McNaughton signed for AFC Wimbledon on a permanent contract. On 7 December 2012, McNaughton was loaned to Kingstonian on a one-month deal. He made his debut on 8 December 2012 in a 1–0 win over Bognor Regis Town.

Kingstonian
On 1 February 2013, McNaughton signed permanently for Isthmian League club Kingstonian after a successful loan spell. Having made a total of seven appearances for the club during his loan and permanent spells McNaughton and Kingstonian parted ways.

Bishop's Stortford
McNaughton re-joined Conference South side Bishop's Stortford on 15 June 2013.

Bromley
After injury plagued McNaughton's move to Welling United, he joined lower division side Maldon & Tiptree briefly. After making one league appearance, he returned to the Conference South with Bromley. He made his debut for the club in a 1–1 Kent Senior Cup draw with Maidstone United. His league debut came on 1 November, in a 4–1 away win over Eastbourne Borough.

Dartford
In June 2015, McNaughton signed for newly relegated National League South side Dartford on a free transfer. He left Dartford at the end of the season having made 30 league appearances and scoring one goal.

Coaching career
Following his playing career, McNaughton began coaching at Juventus' satellite academy in Boston, United States.

Personal life
McNaughton attended Hockerill Anglo-European College.

Career statistics

References

External links

1991 births
Living people
Sportspeople from Harlow
English footballers
Association football defenders
West Ham United F.C. players
Bishop's Stortford F.C. players
AFC Wimbledon players
Kingstonian F.C. players
Welling United F.C. players
Thamesmead Town F.C. players
Maldon & Tiptree F.C. players
Bromley F.C. players
Dartford F.C. players
Hampton & Richmond Borough F.C. players
Tooting & Mitcham United F.C. players
English Football League players
National League (English football) players
Isthmian League players
People educated at Hockerill Anglo-European College
English expatriate sportspeople in the United States
Association football coaches
Juventus F.C. non-playing staff